Michael Tsicoulias (born December 9, 2002) is an American professional soccer player who plays as a forward for Virginia Cavaliers.

Career

Youth
Tsicoulias joined the New England Revolution academy in 2016. In 2020, Tsicoulias spent time with the club's USL League One affiliate team New England Revolution II. He made his debut on September 4, 2020, starting in a fixture against Forward Madison.

College
Tsicoulias has committed to playing college soccer at the University of Virginia in the fall of 2021.

References

2002 births
American soccer players
Association football forwards
Virginia Cavaliers men's soccer players
Living people
Soccer players from Massachusetts
New England Revolution II players
USL League One players
People from Newton, Massachusetts